Lethe callipteris is a butterfly in the family Nymphalidae (Satyrinae). It is found in the East Palearctic where it is endemic to Japan, Sakhalin (L. c. karafutonis Matsumura, 1925) and the Kuriles (L. c. obscura Nakahara, 1926).

The larva feeds on Sasa and Pleioblastus, etc. (Graminae). It has single generation and
hibernates as a larva.

Subspecies
Lethe callipteris callipteris (Japan)
Lethe callipteris karafutonis Matsumura, 1925 (Sakhalin)
Lethe callipteris obscura Nakahara, 1926 (Kuriles)

References

callipteris
Butterflies described in 1877
Butterflies of Japan
Taxa named by Arthur Gardiner Butler